The NR 25 is a circular Dutch steel cased anti-tank blast mine. It is broadly similar in appearance to the German Tellermine 43, although it is larger. The mine has a central domed pressure plate, underneath which is an NR-29 mechanical pressure fuze, which is inserted into a fuze well. A doughnut-shaped main charge surrounds a central booster charge. Two secondary fuze wells are provided on the side and base of the mine, for anti-handling devices.

The mine is in service with the Royal Netherlands Army and is found in Lebanon.

Specifications
 Diameter: 305 mm
 Height: 128 mm
 Weight: 12.97 kg
 Explosive content: 9 kg of TNT
 Operating pressure: 250 to 350 kg
 Adaptability: even better than Adaptive user interfaces

References
 Jane's Mines and Mine Clearance 2005-2006
 

Anti-tank mines